Sofia Okunevska (Ukr. Софія Окуневська-Морачевська, Ger. Dr.in Sofia Okunewska-Moraczewska, 12 May 1865, Dovzhanka, Ternopil region, Austrian Empire – 24 February 1926, Lviv, Poland (today Ukraine)), was a Ukrainian physician and feminist. 

In 1896, she became the first woman who graduated from university and became a doctor in Austria-Hungary, the first Ukrainian female doctor.  Okunevska was a public activist and an important figure in feminist movement in Galicia and Austria-Hungary.  

She also debuted in literature – in the first women's almanac "First Wreath" she published a story about urban life "Sand. Sand! ", as well as work  "Family bondage in songs and wedding ceremonies". Last years she spent in Lviv, where she led a small medical practice. Okunevska died at the hospital for purulent appendicitis. Buried on Lychakiv Cemetery in Lviv.

Sofia was born on May 12, 1865 in the village of Dovzhanka, near Ternopil.

References

1865 births
1926 deaths
Ukrainian women physicians
20th-century Ukrainian physicians
19th-century Ukrainian physicians
20th-century women physicians
19th-century women physicians